Wangcun Subdistrict is a subdistrict in Kuangqu, Datong, Shanxi province, China, located more than  southwest of downtown Datong. , it has 3 residential communities (社区) under its administration.

See also 
 List of township-level divisions of Shanxi

References 

Township-level divisions of Shanxi